The Taluksangay Mosque was built by Hadji Abdullah Maas Nuno in 1885 in the Barangay Taluksangay, Zamboanga, the Philippines. It is the oldest mosque in Western Mindanao.

Taluksangay was the first center of Islamic propagation in the Zamboanga Peninsula. Muslim religious missionaries from Arabia, India, Malaysia, Indonesia and Borneo have been flocking to this village. A representative of the Sultan of Turkey (Sheik-Al Islam) visited this place in later part of 1914.
At the height of the MNLF (Moro National Liberation Front) military conflict in 1973, members of the Quadripartite Committee, Generals Fidel V. Ramos and Romeo Espino, visited Taluksangay village. Even at the height of trouble during the 1970s, tourists continued to arrive in this historical village.
 
The majority of the inhabitants of Taluksangay are Muslims the descendants of the Sama Banguingui who were branded by history as pirates of Southeast Asia, but never conquered.

See also
 Islam in the Philippines

References

External links
 Heritage Conservation Society: Taluksangay Mosque

Mosques in Mindanao
Buildings and structures in Zamboanga City
Mosques completed in 1885
19th-century religious buildings and structures in the Philippines